The 2021 Supercopa Uruguaya was the fourth edition of the Supercopa Uruguaya, Uruguay's football super cup. It was held on 2 May 2021 between the 2020 Primera División champions Nacional and the 2020 Torneo Intermedio runners-up Montevideo Wanderers, who qualified for the Supercopa since Nacional also won the Torneo Intermedio in the 2020 season.

Nacional won the match by a 2–0 score to claim their second Supercopa Uruguaya title in four appearances.

Teams

Details

Notes

References

2021 in Uruguayan football
Supercopa Uruguaya
Supercopa Uruguaya 2021